Tulasco is an extinct town in Elko County, in the U.S. state of Nevada.

Tulasco is a railroad name with an unknown origin.

History

Tulasco had its start in 1869 as a railroad depot on a side track of the Central Pacific railroad.  Tulasco later became the terminus for traffic to Metropolis.  Tulasco consisted of a small depot, a restaurant and a saloon. In 1941, Tulasco had 30 inhabitants.

Today, Tulasco is a railroad siding and only foundations remain.

References

Ghost towns in Elko County, Nevada